Maksim Andreyevich Shirokov (born 26 March 1994) is a Russian football forward. He plays for FC Spartak Kostroma.

Club career
He made his debut in the Russian Second Division for FC Rusichi Oryol on 23 May 2012 in a game against FC Spartak Tambov.

He made his Russian Football National League debut for FC Khimki on 21 August 2016 in a game against FC Sokol Saratov.

References

External links
 

1994 births
Footballers from Moscow
Living people
Russian footballers
Association football midfielders
FC Oryol players
FC Khimki players
FC Lokomotiv Moscow players
FC Torpedo Moscow players
FC Saturn Ramenskoye players
FC Zvezda Perm players
FC Spartak Kostroma players
Russian First League players
Russian Second League players